The 2015 Toulon Tournament was the 43rd edition of the Toulon Tournament. The competition began on 27 May and ended on 7 June 2015.

Participants

AFC

CAF

CONCACAF

UEFA

Source:

Squads

Venues

Group stage

Group A

Group B

Knockout stage

Third place playoff

Final

Goalscorers 
4 goals
 Achraf Bencharki
 Enzo Crivelli

3 goals
 David Ramírez

2 goals

 Chuba Akpom
 Duncan Watmore
 Romain Habran
 Younès Kaabouni
 Stéphane Sparagna
 Carlos Cisneros
 Rai Vloet
 Vincent Janssen
 Alonso Hernández

1 goal

 Guo Yi
 Dylan Flores
 Ariel Lassiter
 Rónald Matarrita
 Rolando Aarons
 Lewis Baker
 Demarai Gray
 Kortney Hause
 Callum Robinson
 Farès Bahlouli
 Mamadou Diarra
 Adrien Hunou
 Ulrich N'Nomo
 Vakoun Bayo
 Abdul Manfouss Koné
 Chris Bedia
 Ousmane Ouattara
 Marco Bueno
 Carlos Guzmán
 Michael Pérez
 Martín Zúñiga
 Soufiane Bahja
 Adam Ennafati
 Hajhouj
 Walid El Karti
 Brahim Darri
 Anwar El Ghazi
 Mohamed Rayhi
 Clint Leemans
 Joris van Overeem
 Hans Hateboer
 Huthaifa Al Salemi
 Othman Al-Yahri
 Fatai Alashe
 Julian Green
 Jerome Kiesewetter
 Jordan Morris
 Will Packwood
 Benji Joya

2 Own goals

1 Own goal
 Cao Haiqing (for )

References

External links 

Toulon Tournament

 
2015
2014–15 in French football
2015 in youth association football
May 2015 sports events in France
June 2015 sports events in France